Harold Edward "Haddie" Gill (January 23, 1899 – August 1, 1932) was a professional baseball pitcher who played in one game for the Cincinnati Reds on August 16, .

Gill died after complications from an appendicitis surgery.

External links

1899 births
1932 deaths
Cincinnati Reds players
Major League Baseball pitchers
Baseball players from Massachusetts
Phillips Exeter Academy alumni
Deaths from appendicitis